James B. Torrance (3 February 1923 – 15 November 2003) was a Scottish theologian, biblical scholar and academic. He was Professor of Systematic Theology at the University of Aberdeen.

Biography
Born in China into the Torrance family of Scottish theologians, to Scottish missionaries to China Thomas Torrance (1871–1959) and Annie Elizabeth Torrance (1883–1980), James was a younger brother to Thomas F. Torrance and father of Alan Torrance. Torrance was educated in Edinburgh, receiving first class degrees in philosophy (for which he was also awarded senior medals in moral philosophy, logic and metaphysics) and theology. Following this he continued his studies in Marburg and Basel, where he studied with Karl Barth, and then continued research in Oxford.

Torrance took a special interest in international politics, being a staunch opponent of Apartheid, and engaging directly with President F. W. de Klerk. He also engaged with Gerry Adams.

He gave the 1994 Didsbury Lectures (published as Worship, Community and the Triune God of Grace) and the 2001 Warfield Lectures at Princeton.

Works
A Festschrift was prepared in honor of Torrance, as well as one which engages the theology of the three Torrance brothers, T. F., James, and David.

Books

Articles and chapters

References

External links
Obituary in The Times
Obituary in The Independent

Scottish Christian theologians
20th-century Protestant theologians
Academics of the University of Aberdeen
1923 births
2003 deaths
Alumni of the University of Edinburgh
Alumni of the University of Oxford
University of Marburg alumni
University of Basel alumni
British expatriates in China